Eve Air Mobility is a Brazilian subsidiary of Embraer which produces electric vertical take-off and landing (eVTOL) aircraft and urban air mobility infrastructure. The company was founded on 15 October 2020. EVE is a brand that was idealized by the innovation division of Embraer called EmbraerX.

Embraer objective with this new company is to accelerate the creation of solutions to make the Urban Air Mobility (UAM) market a reality. The main project of the company is the eVTOL EVE, that concept was presented to the public on 8 May 2018, before the creation of the company.

The first simulator flight of EVE was conducted by Embraer in the city of Rio de Janeiro in September 2021, with the purpose to test the future route for eVTOLs. In the first months of 2022, the company will be listed on NYSE priced at US$2.9 billion under the code EVEX in partnership with the American fund Zanite Acquisition Corp.

On 12 December 2021, Embraer and BAE Systems announced plans to embark on a joint study to explore the development of Eve's vehicle for the defence and security market. As of January 2022, Embraer signed contracts with seventeen companies for 1,735 orders of  eVTOLs, valued at US$5 billion, already aiming the global market leadership.

On 10 February 2022, Embraer requested to National Civil Aviation Agency of Brazil (ANAC) the certification for the eVTOL EVE.

In 2022, the company went public on the New York Stock Exchange following the company's merger with Zanite Acquisition Corp.

References

Embraer
Companies based in São Paulo (state)
Companies listed on the New York Stock Exchange
Aircraft manufacturers of Brazil
Defence companies of Brazil
Brazilian brands
Urban air mobility
EVTOL aircraft